Euspilotus rossi is a species of clown beetle in the family Histeridae. It is found in North America.

References

Further reading

 

Histeridae
Articles created by Qbugbot
Beetles described in 1939